Mount Lawn Speedway, also known as The Lawn, is a 3/10 mile asphalt, egg-shaped oval track located in Greensboro, Indiana.

History

Mt. Lawn Speedway was founded in 1935 by Dr. George W. Sweigart, a dentist and a former mayor for the town of Hartford City, Indiana. At the time of the track's opening it was a one-fifth mile pear-shaped dirt oval. Also constructed during the early years of the track were a dance hall, a swimming pool, as well as summer cabins for vacationers. The dance hall played host to two the most influential big band musicians of the era, The Dorsey Brothers and Sammy Kaye. However, in 1939 a fire caused by an overheated exhaust fan in the orchestra pit led to the dance hall's first demise. When the hall was rebuilt, a second fire caused by a coal-powered fireplace led to the dancehall's second, and ultimately final demise.

In 1940 Sweigart closed the track down and it appeared that racing in Henry County was over. However, later that year a local promoter named Dutch Hurst visited the area looking for a lighting system for a track that he was constructing known as the Muncie Vellodrome located in Muncie, Indiana. When he noticed the layout of the land he mentioned to Sweigart " Why don't you start a track here"? When Sweigart replied that the land had indeed been a race track before, Hurst convinced Sweigart to reopen the track. In 1941 he hired a local farmer to retill the land as Sweigart and local residents rebuilt the track. However, later that summer the dirt surface of the track had worn down and it was decided that a new surface would be needed. So Sweigart hired a crew from the area and the first concrete surface was laid on the track. This paving would be followed by three repavings in asphalt in 1947, 1967, and finally in 1971.

Over the next 73 years, the track would see many famous names grace its presence, including Tony Stewart, Ed Carpenter, Pat O'Connor, Tom Cherry, Art Cross, and many others. It was a hotbed for open-wheel modifieds in the 1980s and 1990s, as the IMCA Modified Series would see drivers from across the Midwest come to the Speedway to try their hands at the tricky course against the local stars. Following the dwindling of the IMCA series in the late 1990s, late model stock cars would return to prominence in the area and would become the standard-bearer for the next decade and a half. In 2014, the track would close temporarily due to declining interest and car counts and would remain closed til 2016, as interest returned. The late model stocks however would not, as street stocks would become the Premier division at the track and all late model races would be promoted by the Champion Racing Association Late Model Sportsman Series.

Late in 2019, it was announced that driver Dave Duncan and Winchester Speedway co-promoter Jimmy Wyman would begin promoting all races at Mt. Lawn, with Rick Sweigart still retaining ownership. Modified racing would make its full-time return, with a slate of races in 2020. The first race under the new agreement would take place on June 14, with Jeff Lane, a longtime competitor in the previous incarnations of the modified, late model, and street stock classes winning the first race.

The Big Three

There are three big events that are currently run at The Mt. Lawn Speedway. The May 5–0, which is held the evening of the Indianapolis 500, The Raintree 100 which is a 100-lap Late Model stock car event, and The Founders Day 100, a 100-lap Thunder Car Division race. The Stock Car Extravaganza has not been run in a number of years.

Raintree 100 winners

Divisions 

Currently there are 3 Weekly Divisions at Mt. Lawn Speedway.

The Late Model Division is the Premier weekly division.
The frame for this division is a General Motors 1978 to 1987; "G" body, 108.1", metric frame.
However, cars may be powered by any engine brand.  The cars must run complete late model bodies, including roof, that resemble a stock make and model. The "current" Late Model Division made its debut on May 13, 2000.  Six cars were at the track on opening night. Today the division typically has twenty or more cars on hand each week.

The Thundercar Division is the Intermediate weekly division at Mt. Lawn Speedway.
Thundercars are mostly stock, with a few after-market racing components allowed.  Any rear-wheel-drive full-sized car with a wheelbase of not less than 108 inches is eligible to compete in the Thundercar Division.

The Hornet Division is the Beginner weekly division.  Hornets are a strictly stock class.  Four or six-cylinder cars are eligible to compete.  Four-cylinder cars may be front- or rear-wheel drive.  Six-cylinder cars can be front-wheel drive only.  The wheelbase, no matter the drive train, must be between 92" and 108".

Past champions

References 

Tourist attractions in Henry County, Indiana
Motorsport venues in Indiana
Buildings and structures in Henry County, Indiana